Gérard Drainville (May 20, 1930 – May 11, 2014) was a Roman Catholic bishop.

Drainville was born in 1930 on Ile Du Pas to Norbert Drainville and Angeline Farley. After graduating from Joliette Seminary, Drainville studied  geology and biology at the University of Montreal.

After graduation, he became a biology professor at Joliette Seminary, Le collège constituant de Joliette partie intégrante du Cégep régional de Lanaudière and Sacred Heart of Antanimena School in Antananarivo in Madagascar.

Ordained to the priesthood in 1953, Drainville became vicar of Saint-Lin–Laurentides in 1973 before becoming bishop of the Diocese of Amos, Canada, in 1978.

He resigned from the office in 2004. Drainville died in Amos, Quebec.

Notes

1930 births
2014 deaths
21st-century Roman Catholic bishops in Canada
20th-century Roman Catholic bishops in Canada
Roman Catholic bishops of Amos